Romeo and Juliet in the Snow is a 1920 German silent comedy film directed by Ernst Lubitsch and starring Lotte Neumann, Julius Falkenstein and Gustav von Wangenheim.

Cast
 Lotte Neumann as Julia
 Gustav von Wangenheim as Romeo
 Jakob Tiedtke as Bauer
 Marga Köhler as Bäuerin
 Ernst Rückert as Montekugerl
 Paul Biensfeldt as Beamte
 Julius Falkenstein as Paris
 Hermann Picha as Beamte
 Josefine Dora as Frau Montekugerl

References

Bibliography
 Kristin Thompson. Herr Lubitsch Goes to Hollywood: German and American Film After World War I. Amsterdam University Press, 2005.

External links

1920 films
Films of the Weimar Republic
German silent feature films
Films directed by Ernst Lubitsch
German comedy films
1920 comedy films
German black-and-white films
Silent comedy films
1920s German films